Pancheshwar (Nepali: पञ्चेश्वर ) is a Gaupalika(Nepali: गाउपालिका ; gaupalika) in Baitadi District in the Sudurpashchim Province of far-western Nepal. 
Pancheshwar has a population of 18766.The land area is 120.41 km2.

References

Rural municipalities in Baitadi District
Populated places in Baitadi District
Rural municipalities of Nepal established in 2017